Cymbidium floribundum, the yellow margin orchid, golden leaf-edge orchid or golden-edged orchid, is a species of orchid.

3-Hydroxyoctanoic acid is a signalling chemical emitted by C. floribundum and recognized by Japanese honeybees (Apis cerana japonica).

References 

floribundum